Southampton Campus was a rail station located along the Montauk Branch of the Long Island Rail Road. Originally a seasonal flag stop called Golf Grounds, it opened April 1907 to serve sites such as the Shinnecock Hills Golf Club and National Golf Links of America and was closed in 1938.

In order to serve the Long Island University's Southampton College (now owned by Stony Brook University) it reopened on May 24, 1976. It was discontinued as a station stop and removed on March 16, 1998, due to low usage, along with a handful of other Long Island Rail Road stations. The station only had an average daily ridership of 16 and the low ridership did not make it cost effective for high level platforms to be installed to accommodate new bilevel rail cars.

A temporary station was opened in June 2004 for the U.S. Open and was listed as Shinnecock Hills on special timetables. The same situation occurred in 2018 during the 2018 U.S. Open Golf Championship. The Long Island Rail Road also provided service for spectators traveling to the 1986 U.S. Open, when the station was called Southampton College.

References

Railway stations in the United States opened in 1907
1907 establishments in New York (state)
Railway stations closed in 1939
Railway stations in the United States opened in 1976
Railway stations closed in 1998
Former Long Island Rail Road stations in Suffolk County, New York
Southampton (town), New York
1998 disestablishments in New York (state)